Central San Pedro is a controversial energy project that aims to build a hydroelectric power plant in San Pedro River, Los Ríos Region, Chile. The project was halted in 2009 due to problems associated with the geology of the area, but then reactivated in 2019.

As of 2019 the municipalities of Panguipulli and Los Lagos, the two most directly affected communes, have rejected the project. The mayor of Los Lagos, among other people, has expressed concerns over the projects impact on tourism and biodiversity. On September 7, 2019, three or more armed persons attacked the temporary installations of the project setting the storehouse ablaze. Within a week Colbún S.A. had responded by filling legal actions against the responsible.

See also
HidroAysén

References

Energy infrastructure in Los Ríos Region
Dam controversies
Hydroelectricity in Chile
Mapuche conflict
Proposed hydroelectric power stations
Proposed renewable energy power stations in Chile